Evidence is a 1915 silent film drama directed by and starring early film actor Edwin August and released by the World Film Company. It is lost film.

Some or all of the film may have been shot in color as one of the locations was the Kinemacolor Studios in Flushing, Queens, New York. The film is based on a Broadway stage play, Evidence, performed in 1914. Actress Haidee Wright reprises her role from the play in this film.

Cast
Edwin August - Curley Lushington
Lillian Tucker - Lady Una Wimbourne
Haidee Wright - Duchess of Gillingham
Florence Hackett - Mrs. Ebengham
Richard Temple - Captain Pollock
Lionel Pape - Bertie Stavely
Richard Buhler - Lord Cyril Wimbourne
Maurice Steuart - Abington 'Bing' Wimbourne(*uncredited)

References

External links

1915 films
American silent feature films
American films based on plays
Lost American films
Films directed by Edwin August
1915 drama films
Silent American drama films
American black-and-white films
World Film Company films
1915 lost films
Lost drama films
1910s American films